Hello Dummy! is a comedy album released by American comedian Don Rickles. It was recorded at the Sahara Hotel and Casino in Las Vegas, Nevada, and released in 1968. It peaked at No. 54 on the Billboard 200 music chart. The album consists of one track that runs for its entire duration.

Reception

In a retrospective review, Jason Ankeny of Allmusic rated Hello Dummy! four out of a possible five stars. He explained that Rickles "steadfastly remains a true equal-opportunity offender, spitting out insults with the speed and force of a rivet gun and without regard to gender, race, creed, or sexuality" and that "Hello Dummy! captures Don Rickles at the peak of his vicious powers". He concluded: "While certainly never a comedic revolutionary on par with Lenny Bruce, Rickles somehow transcends political correctness so completely that he whips the crowd into a communal fervor worthy of a preacher."

Track listing
"Hello Dummy!"  – 35:39

References

Don Rickles albums
Live spoken word albums